The Florida International University College of Arts, Education and Sciences is the liberal arts college at Florida International University. Founded in 1965, it is the largest of FIU's 26 schools and colleges, and offers bachelor's degrees, master degree's, doctorates, and first professional degrees. As of 2009, the College of Arts and Sciences has 35,291 alumni, and awards approximately 2,342 degrees annually.

Organization

The college is organized into 26 departments:
For up-to-date information on majors and degrees available through the FIU College of Arts and Sciences, visit the CAS website at: Certificates and Minors offered at the CAS

Facilities
The College of Arts and Sciences is housed in many of the university's buildings, such as Primera Casa, Deuxieme Maison, Owa Ehan, Viertes Haus, the Chemistry and Physics Building and the Management and Advanced Research Center. On the Biscayne Bay Campus, the Marine Biology Building houses the department of Biological Sciences and marine research. In Spring 2007, construction will begin on the Social Sciences building on the northeast side of campus.

References

External links

Florida International University

Florida International University
Liberal arts colleges at universities in the United States